Collinsville High School (CHS) is a four-year public high school in the Collinsville Community Unit School District 10 in Illinois.  In 2011, Collinsville High School had an enrollment of 1,985 students.

Academics
In 2015, 85% of the senior class graduated, posting an average ACT score of 20.  Based on scores earned on the Prairie State Achievement Examination, Collinsville High School is not achieving Adequate Yearly Progress (AYP) in meeting the requirements of the federal No Child Left Behind Act.  The school, overall, is not making AYP in reading and mathematics.  One student subgroup is not making AYP in reading.  The school is on year three of Academic Watch.

Athletics
Collinsville competes in the Southwestern Conference.  The school is also a member of the Illinois High School Association (IHSA).  Teams are stylized as the Kahoks (pronounced Kay-Hawks).

The school sponsors interscholastic athletic teams for young men and women in basketball, bowling, cross country, golf, soccer, tennis, and track & field.  Young men may also compete in baseball, football, and wrestling, while young women may also compete in cheerleading, softball, and volleyball.  While not sponsored by the IHSA, the school also sponsors a Marching band and dance team.

State titles

 Baseball: 1940–41, 1979–80
 Basketball:1960–61, 1964–65
 Bowling (girls): 2009–2010
 Soccer (boys): 1981–82, 1986–87, 1991–92, 1992–93
 Dance Team (girls): 2007-2009, 2011, 2015
 Marching Band: 3rd place at Tiger Ambush Classic (2011); 1st place at prelims, 10th place in Finals, and best general effect at Lafayette Contest of Champions (2011); 1st place in 3A, Best Music, Best Visual, Outstanding General Effect, Best Percussion, Best Color Guard, And Grand Championships of class 1A, 2A, and 3A at McKendree Preview of Champions (2011); 1st place Blue Division, Outstanding Music, and Outstanding Visual at Greater St. Louis Marching Festival. (2011);  2nd Place VP Fair Parade (2012); 3rd place O'Fallon Township High School Metro East Marching Classic participating in class AA. (2012); 1st place in 3A, Best Music, Best Visual, Outstanding General Effect, Best Percussion, Best Color Guard, And Grand Championships of class 1A, 2A, and 3A at McKendree Preview of Champions (2012) First Place, Best Visual at the Veiled Prophet Parade (2013), First Place class 4A, Best Percussion, Best Visual, Best General Effect, Best Color Guard (of the day) at the McKendree Preview of Champions (2013), 4th Place in Class AAA at Bands of America Grand Nationals (2013), Grand Champion, 1st Place in Class 3A Field (Music, Visual, GE, Percussion, Guard) at McKendree Preview of Champions (2014), 1st Place in Class 4A Field (Music, Visual, GE, Percussion, Guard) at McKendree Preview of Champions (2015), 3rd Place in Class 4A Field Metro East Marching Classic (2015), 2nd Place in Class 3A Field at the Tiger Ambush Classic (2015)
 Winter Percussion Ensemble: 1st place MCCGA championships Scholastic B Class (2011)

Departments
Collinsville High School is educational organized into thirteen departments.

These include:
 Business
 English
 ELL
 Family Consumer Science
 Fine Arts
 Foreign Language
 Industrial Technology 
 Math
 PE, Heath, and Drivers Education
 Science
 Social Studies
 Special Education
 Counseling

Notable alumni

 Michelle Bartsch-Hackley, Olympic gold medalist, USA Olympic volleyball player and professional volleyball player
 Hoot Evers - former MLB player (Detroit Tigers, Boston Red Sox, New York Giants, Baltimore Orioles, Cleveland Indians)
 Charlie Kraak - basketball player (Indiana University)
 Harry Parker - former MLB player (St. Louis Cardinals, New York Mets, Cleveland Indians) 
 Michael Stipe - lead singer of the band R.E.M.
 John Shimkus (R) - member of the U.S. House of Representatives
 Tom Jager - Olympic gold medalist (swimming)
 Ken Oberkfell - former Major League Baseball player
 George Musso - NFL Hall of Famer (inducted 1982)
 Art Fletcher - former Major League baseball player
 Tom Parker - former basketball player, University of Kentucky
 Kevin Stallings - head basketball coach, University of Pittsburgh
 Daniel A. Vallero, research scientist; author; educator (Duke University)
 Joe Reiniger - former soccer player for the St. Louis Ambush, Milwaukee Wave and St. Louis Steamers and current player for the St. Louis Illusion
 Terry Moore - center fielder for the St. Louis Cardinals
 Rear Admiral William D. Baumgartner - United States Coast Guard
 Rick George - president of Texas Rangers, director of operations PGA Tour, athletic director University of Colorado
 Tanner Houck - first round pick in the 2017 MLB Draft by the Boston Red Sox

External links
 Official website
 District Website

References

Public high schools in Illinois
Schools in St. Clair County, Illinois